The following is a list of the top 20 exports of Australia in 2017-18, as reported by its Department of Foreign Affairs and Trade.

References

Notes

Australia
Exports
Foreign trade of Australia